Tizi N'Tleta (formerly: Acif Boulma) is a town and commune in Tizi Ouzou Province in Kabylie (northern Algeria).

History 

It was in Ighil Imoula, one of the villages of Tizi N'tleta, that thousands of copies of the proclamation of November 1, 1954 that began the Algerian revolution were printed.

Geography

Location 
Tizi N'Tleta is in the south of Tizi Ouzou Wilaya province and is bordered by Beni Douala, Ouadhia, Aït Bouaddou, Assi Youcef, Mechtras, and Souk El Thenine.

Villages of the commune 
Since its foundation, Tizi N'Tleta has been composed of nine villages:

 Tizi N'Tleta
 Tighoza Athmane
 Ighil ImoulaVill
 Aït El Hadjali
 Aït Ouali
 Aït Abeed ait
 Maghzel Mal Tassoukit
 Ighil Naït Chila
 Tadert Oufella

References

Communes of Tizi Ouzou Province